David Berezovski (1896–1943) was a journalist, writer, translator and newspaper editor active in Vilnius and Grodno in the 1920s and 1930s. He was killed in The Holocaust in 1943, possibly at the Treblinka extermination camp.

Biography
Berezovski was born in 1896 in Meletch, Vilna Governorate, Russian Empire (now Merkinė, Lithuania). His father Nakhman was a lumber merchant who gave him a basic Jewish education; his mother was named Rivke. He then studied at a Gymnasium in Vilnius, and he also started but never completed university studies in Germany, the Soviet Union, and at the University of Vilna.

In the early 1920s he also translated a handful of Maxim Gorky's books into Yiddish and published them in Vilnius, including My Childhood in 1920 and Mother in 1922. And he was involved in education and in the publishing of children's educational materials; he himself also translated some popular scientific and historical works from Russian into Yiddish. He used the paper as a platform to criticize the government and examine the life of local Jews in more detail. The inner pages of the newspaper seem to have consisted of news from Warsaw newspapers. In the late 1920s he also ran for municipal office but does not seem to have been elected.

Berezovski was also a supporter of the Yiddish theatre. In the 1930s he regularly collaborated with comedian Yitzhak Azarkh to bring Yiddish theatre troupes to Grodno. He also regularly wrote reviews of the Yiddish theatre. His newspaper was closed during the Soviet invasion of Poland in 1939, on the same day that the Red Army entered Grodno. After that he was reduced to working for the Belarusian paper , transcribing radio broadcasts of news stories. But even that job disappeared after he was denounced in an open letter as the former editor of a "fascist" newspaper.

Grodno was invaded by German forces in June 1941 and its Jewish residents were forced into the Grodno Ghetto by November. He then worked in an infirmary with his daughter Basya. The two of them, along with David's wife Kunie, were deported to the Treblinka extermination camp in 1943 where they are all thought to have been killed, although David's exact place of death is not well documented.

Selected works
  (translation of a Vasily Nemirovich-Danchenko book, 1921)
  (1921)
  (1921)
  (1922)
  (a translation of Maxim Gorky's Mother, 1922)

References

External links
 Grodner Moment issues (newspaper edited by Berezovski) in the National Library of Israel collection
 Books by Dowid Berezowski and newspapers he edited in Polona

1896 births
1943 deaths
20th-century Polish journalists
Jewish Polish writers
Yiddish theatre
Polish people who died in Treblinka extermination camp
Yiddish-language journalists
Polish translators
People from Vilna Governorate
Polish Jews who died in the Holocaust
20th-century Polish male writers